The Ticket is a 1997 American television film directed and produced by Stuart Cooper and starring Shannen Doherty, James Marshall and Phillip Van Dyke. It aired on the USA Network.

Plot
Cee Cee Reicker accepts to fly with her husband, Keith and her son to get a 23 million dollars prize, that her husband won. The plane is forced to land somewhere on a snowy mountain. She later discovers that their plane crash isn't really accidental.

Cast
 Shannen Doherty as CeeCee Reicker
 James Marshall as Keith Reicker
 Phillip Van Dyke as Eric Riecker

Reception
Phillip Van Dyke was nominated for the Young Artist Award in the category of "Best Performance in a TV Movie/Pilot/Mini-Series - Supporting Young Actor" for his performance in this movie.

References

External links
 
 
 The Ticket at Moviefone
 The Ticket at Daily Grind House
 The Ticket at Letter Box D

1997 films
American thriller television films
USA Network original films
1990s English-language films
1990s American films